The 1991 Pot Black was the first of the revived professional invitational snooker tournament after a 5-year absence and the 19th series altogether. It took place between 18 and 20 August 1991 and broadcast in September and October. This time, the tournament was held at Trentham Gardens in Stoke-on-Trent which formally hosted the International and it was played alongside the Junior Pot Black competition which also got revived, and featured sixteen professional players in a knock-out system. All matches until the semi-final were one-frame shoot-outs, the semi-final was aggregate score of two frames and the final being contested over the best of three frames.

Broadcasts had been moved from primetime BBC2 to an afternoon slot on BBC1 and shown on Mondays and Wednesdays and the series started at 15:05 on Monday 2 September 1991,. Eammon Holmes was the new presenter for the series and three times Pot Black champion John Spencer joined Ted Lowe in the commentary box for the new series while John Williams remained as referee.

Players in this year's series were the top 16 ranked players for the 1991–92 season including former Pot Black winners Doug Mountjoy, Steve Davis, Terry Griffiths and defending champion Jimmy White and former Junior Pot Black players Dean Reynolds, John Parrott and Stephen Hendry. The final was won by Davis by winning the title for the third time beating Hendry 2–1 and equalling John Spencer and Eddie Charlton.

Main draw

Final

References

Pot Black
1991 in snooker
1991 in English sport